Richard John Grecco (born 4 March 1946) is a Canadian prelate of the Roman Catholic Church. He was the 13th Bishop of Charlottetown from 2009 to 2021.

Biography
Born in Thorold, Ontario to Anthony and Lily Grecco, Richard Grecco attended St. Augustine's Seminary, Toronto and was ordained to the priesthood on 2 September 1973. He furthered his studies at the Pontifical Gregorian University, Rome and the University of St. Michael's College, Toronto, from where he obtained a doctorate in theology in 1982. He served as a parish priest and a professor of moral theology at St. Michael's College, Toronto and St. Joseph's College, Edmonton.

On 5 December 1997, Grecco was appointed Auxiliary Bishop of London, Ontario and Titular Bishop of Uccula by Pope John Paul II. He received his episcopal consecration on 2 February 1998 from Bishop Thomas Fulton, with Bishops John O'Mara and John Sherlock serving as co-consecrators. He selected as his episcopal motto: "Hope in the Lord".

Grecco was named Auxiliary Bishop of Toronto on 27 April 2002. In Toronto, he served as the senior vicar general and the episcopal vicar of the Central Pastoral Region and Scarborough, composed of approximately 98 parishes. He also worked with many lay associations and ethnic communities in the Toronto Archdiocese, and served on numerous boards and committees including the National Executive for Development and Peace and the Pontifical Mission Society.

On 11 July 2009, Pope Benedict XVI appointed Grecco the thirteenth Bishop of Charlottetown, Prince Edward Island. He succeeded Vernon Fougère, who retired due to poor health after a 17-year-long tenure. As Bishop, he was the spiritual leader of 63,240 Catholics in Prince Edward Island.

On March 4, 2021, his 75th birthday, he resigned as the Bishop of Charlottetown having reached the retirement age set by  canon law.

See also

References

1946 births
Living people
People from Thorold
Roman Catholic bishops of Charlottetown
Almo Collegio Capranica alumni